Richard Angelo Morales (born September 20, 1943 at San Francisco, California) is an American former professional baseball player, coach and manager. An infielder, he appeared in Major League Baseball between 1967–1974 for the Chicago White Sox and San Diego Padres. He threw and batted right-handed.

In the Majors, Morales played 480 games, starting 294.  Of all non-pitchers since 1930 with 1000+ at bats, Morales had a better batting average (.195) than only two, Ray Oyler and Mike Ryan, and a slugging average (.242) better than only Luis Gómez.

After his playing career, Morales was an MLB coach for the Atlanta Braves (on the staff of his former White Sox pilot, Chuck Tanner) and a minor league manager for eight seasons, from  until  and from  until . He worked in the farm systems of the Oakland Athletics, Chicago Cubs, and Seattle Mariners.

Sources
 Sabermetric Baseball Encyclopedia

1943 births
Living people
Atlanta Braves coaches
Baltimore Orioles scouts
Baseball players from California
Chicago White Sox players
Chicago White Sox scouts
Clinton C-Sox players
Evansville White Sox players
Hawaii Islanders players
Lynchburg White Sox players
Major League Baseball infielders
Minor league baseball managers
San Diego Padres players
Tidewater Tides players
Tucson Toros players